Richard John Darcey (26 February 1870 – 26 July 1944) was an Australian politician. Born in Launceston, Tasmania, he received a primary education before becoming an apprentice jeweller. He eventually became a jeweller in Hobart, and rose to become President of the Retail Jewellers' Association. In 1937, he was elected to the Australian Senate as a Labor Senator for Tasmania. He held the seat until 1943, when he was defeated, having been demoted to fourth place on the ballot to make way for Tasmanian state minister Nick McKenna. Darcey died in 1944.

References

Australian Labor Party members of the Parliament of Australia
Members of the Australian Senate for Tasmania
Members of the Australian Senate
1871 births
1944 deaths
Australian jewellers
20th-century Australian politicians